This is a list of mayors of Long Beach, California.

The current mayor is Rex Richardson who has been in office since December 20, 2022. He is the first black person to hold the position.

History
Prior its creation, the equivalent to the office of mayor was referred to as the President of the Board of Trustees. The title of mayor was officially created in 1908, following the completion of the new city charter. Until 1988, the mayor was indirectly elected by the city council from amongst themselves. The first mayor to be directly elected was Ernie Kell in 1988.

List of Mayors

See also
Timeline of Long Beach, California

References

External links
Longbeach.gov: History of the mayors of Long Beach

Long Beach
.
M